Cysatus is a lunar impact crater that is located in the southern part of the Moon's near side. It is joined to the northeastern rim of the larger crater Gruemberger, and intrudes slightly into the interior of that formation. Due south is the larger Moretus, and to the east is Curtius. These craters appear foreshortened when observed from Earth because of their far south location.

This circular crater is slightly unusual for its lack of interesting features. No notable craters lie along its rim or the flat, level interior. The inner walls are devoid of terraces and just slope down to the flat floor, although the width of the inner wall is narrower to the northeast than elsewhere.

Satellite craters 

By convention these features are identified on lunar maps by placing the letter on the side of the crater midpoint that is closest to Cysatus.

References 

 
 
 
 
 
 
 
 
 
 
 
 

Impact craters on the Moon